Indra Lesmana (born in Jakarta, Indonesia on 28 March 1966) is an Indonesian arranger, composer, songwriter and jazz musician of mixed Dutch, Javanese, Minangkabau and Madurese descent. He is the father of Indonesian actress and singer-songwriter, Eva Celia Lesmana.

Biography
Lesmana grew up in a house of music and musicians. His father was jazz guitarist  and his mother  was a singer. He began playing piano when he was nine. A year later, he played in his father's band. He attended the New South Wales Conservatorium of Music in Australia.

In 1981, he and his father formed the Jack and Indra Lesmana Quartet with Karim Suweileh and James Morrison. The album Children of Fantasy was recorded in Indonesia and released by Queen Records. When he returned to Australia, he formed the Latin jazz fusion band Children of Fantasy with Jack Lesmana, Steve Brien, Dale Barlow, Tony Thijssen, and Harry Rivers. In 1982 he started Nebula with Andy Evans, Vince Genova, Carlinhos Goncalves, Steve Hunter, and Ken James. The album No Standing, with four compositions by Lesmana, was released in Australia by Jasmine and in Indonesia by Jackson. In 1983, he joined Tony Buck, Sandy Evans, and Steve Elphick to form the modern jazz band Women and Children First and recorded their first album in 1983.

Zebra, an affiliate of MCA signed him to a contract and released No Standing as his solo album. The album was remastered by Bernie Grundman before being released in the U.S.

Lesmana moved to California in 1985 and recorded For Earth and Heaven (1986) with Vinnie Colaiuta, Charlie Haden, Jimmy Haslip, Tootie Heath, Michael Landau, Airto Moreira, and Bobby Shew. His singles "No Standing" (No Standing) and "Stephanie" (For Earth and Heaven) entered the Billboard magazine jazz chart. He formed a 17-piece big band in March 2002. He wrote his first big band arrangement for the soundtrack to the film Rumah Ke Tujuh produced by his sister, Mira Lesmana.

Audio engineering
Lesmana has deep interest in audio technology. His album Tragedi (1984) was first as a sound designer. In 1998 he produced Sabda Prana album by Java Jazz. In 1999 he decided to establish a mixing and mastering house specializing in jazz. He has mixed and mastered more than 20 albums by Indonesian acts such as Andien, Dewa Budjana, Chlorophyl, Delon, Simak Dialog, The Groove, Humania, Ermy Kullit, Maliq & D'Essentials, Rieka Roeslan, Donny Suhendra. He was nominated for Best Mixing Engineer for the album Rumah Ke Tujuh at AMI Awards 2003.

Other work
In early 2004, with his wife Hanny Trihandojo Lesmana and Aksan Syuman, organized a weekly program in South Jakarta to encourage young people to explore music and dance. In March 2004, Lesmana was hired by Fremantle Media and RCTI to be a judge on Indonesian Idol. He was a judge in the first Asian Idol held in Indonesia.

Discography 
 1978 Ayahku Sahabatku
 1981 Children of Fantasy
 1982 No Standing
 1982 Nostalgia
 1982 Latin Jazz Fusion (Special Edition)
 1983 Women and Children First
 1984 Tragedi
 1984 Yang Pertama Yang Bahagia
 1986 For Earth and Heaven
 1986 Karina
 1986 Gemilang
 1986 Jack & Indra Lesmana Various
 1987 La Samba Primadona
 1987 Semakin Menawan
 1988 Ekspresi
 1989 Titi DJ 1989
 1989 Kau Datang
 1990 Aku Ingin
 1990 Dunia Boleh Tertawa
 1991 Adegan
 1991 Cerita Lalu
 1992 Selangkah Di Depan
 1992 Hanya Untukmu
 1993 Biarkan Aku Kembali
 1994 Tiada Kata
 1994 Waktu Berjalan
 1994 Kehadiran
 1994 Bulan Di Atas Asia
 1994 Ayah
 1995 Kabut Di Kaki Langit
 1995 Jalan Yang Hilang
 1996 Romantic Piano
 1996 Jalan Hidupmu
 1996 Menari-Nari
 1997 Lost Forest
 1997 Selamat Tinggal
 1998 Kedua
 1998 Sabda Prana
 1999 Saat Yang Terindah
 2000 Interaksi
 2000 Reborn
 2001 The Birds
 2002 Kinanti
 2002 Rumah Ke Tujuh
 2003 Gelatik
 2005 Silver
 2006 Jalinan Kasih
 2007 Kayon – Tree of life
 2008 Kembali Satu
 2009 Dream Hope and Faith
 2010 Joy Joy Joy
 2011 Love Life Wisdom – featuring LLW (Indra Lesmana, Barry Likumahuwa & Sandy Winarta)
 2012 Indra Lesmana 11:11 ( iOS app album )
 2013 Loose Loud Whiz – featuring LLW (Lesmana Likumahuwa Works)
 2013 Adriana OST
 2014 Stars
 2014 Ring P.I.G Tone ( P.I.G)
 2015 Mutual Affection
 2015 Change
 2015 Frangipani
 2015 Eclipse
 2016 About Jack
 2017 Chapter One (Krakatau Reunion)
 2017 "Distance" (single)
 2018 Surya Sewana
 2018 Sacred Geometry

Awards 
 Best Jazz/Pop Keyboards Instrumentalist – Gadis [1989]
 Best Pop Selling Album: Aku Ingin – BASF Awards [1990]
 Diamond Achievement Awards – De Beers Diamond [1995]
 Best Jazz/Fusion Album – producer: Ermi Kullit – Saat Yang Terindah – 4th AMI Awards [2000]
 Best Jazz Vocalist – News Music Awards [2001]
 Best Keyboardist – News Music Awards [2001]
 Best Instrumental Song: "Reborn" – 5th AMI Awards [2001]
 Best Jazz/Contemporary Jazz Album – producer: Andien – Kinanti – 6th AMI Awards [2002]
 Best Score/Soundtrack: Rumah Ke Tujuh – Festival Film Bandung [2003]
 Best Jazz/Contemporary Jazz Artist – 7th AMI Awards [2003]
 Best Jazz Song: "Mimpi & Rumah ke Tujuh" – 7th AMI Awards [2003]
 Best Jazz Arranger: "Mimpi & Rumah ke Tujuh" – 7th AMI Awards [2003]
 Best Jazz Producer: "OST Rumah ke Tujuh" – 7th AMI Awards [2003]
 Most Radical Musician: Nokia 7600 [2004]
 Rolling Stone magazine Indonesia – 41st Best Indonesian Album of All Time: Reborn [2007]
 Most Favorite Jazz Player: JAK JAZZ [2008]
 Rolling Stone magazine Indonesia – 68th Best Indonesian Song (1950–2008): "Aku Ingin" [2009]
 Most Prominent Jazz Musician: 33rd Jazz Goes to Campus – 4th JGTC Award  [2010]
 Australian Alumni Award for Cultural & Art [2010]
 Best Jazz Artist Instrumental Performance: 14th AMI Awards [2011]
 Most Influential Indonesian Musician on Twitter: [2011]
 Brand Personality Award – Contribution to the World of Jazz Music: Asia Pacific Brand Foundation at Kuala Lumpur International Jazz Festival [2012]

References

External links
Official site

1966 births
Anugerah Musik Indonesia winners
Indo people
Indonesian jazz musicians
Indonesian jazz singers
21st-century Indonesian male singers
Indonesian people of Dutch descent
Indonesian record producers
Indonesian songwriters
20th-century Indonesian male singers
Living people
Maya Award winners
Minangkabau people
Madurese people
Javanese people
Musicians from Jakarta
Singers from Jakarta
Sydney Conservatorium of Music alumni
Male jazz musicians